The 2018–19 Kosovar Cup was the football knockout competition of Kosovo in the 2018–19 season.

Second round
The draw for the second round was held on 6 November 2018.

Results:

Third round
The draw for the third round was held on 30 November 2018.

Quarter-finals
The draw for the fourth round was held on 11 December 2018.

Semifinals
These matches were played on 17 April and 1 May 2019.

First leg

Second leg

Final

References

Kosovar Cup seasons
Kosovo
Cup